The 1969 San Diego Chargers season was the team's tenth as a franchise and their ninth in San Diego. It began with the team trying to improve on their 9–5 record in 1968, as this would be the last season for the team with a winning record until 1978. It was the last American Football League season before the AFL–NFL merger. It was also Sid Gillman's final season as the team's head coach, as he resigned due to poor health in the middle of the season, and Charlie Waller took over for the last five games.

Draft

Roster

Schedule

Standings

References

San Diego Chargers
San Diego Chargers seasons
San Diego Chargers season